William Leigh Mellish (11 June 1813 – 18 April 1864) was an English soldier, landowner and cricketer who played first-class cricket for Cambridge University in 1832. He was born in East Tuddenham, Norfolk and died at Hodsock Priory, near Worksop, Nottinghamshire.

Mellish was the elder son of the Rev. Edward Mellish, rector of East Tuddenham and later Dean of Hereford and his wife, who was Elizabeth Jane Leigh. George Mellish, a noted mid-Victorian barrister and judge, was his younger brother. He was educated at Eton College and at Trinity College, Cambridge. While at Cambridge University, he appeared in two first-class cricket matches for the university side, both of them against the Cambridge Town Club; in one, he opened the batting, in the other he played as a tail-end batsman.

Mellish left Cambridge without taking a degree; in 1833 he became an officer in the British Army: he is recorded as a second lieutenant in 1833 and as a captain in 1842, but he sold his commission in 1846 and left the full-time army. Thereafter he served with the local Nottinghamshire militia and at his death in 1864 he was recorded as "Lieutenant-Colonel of the Royal Sherwood Foresters". In 1855, he inherited Hodsock Priory, which had been held by the Mellish family since the 17th century, from his cousin Anne Chambers, née Mellish. Upon his death, his son Henry Mellish inherited Hodsock Priory.

References

1813 births
1864 deaths
English cricketers
Cambridge University cricketers
People educated at Eton College
Alumni of Trinity College, Cambridge
Sherwood Foresters officers
People from Breckland District
Military personnel from Norfolk